Cyprinus melanes is a species of ray-finned fish in the genus Cyprinus from the Kiến Giang River basin in Vietnam.

References 

 

Cyprinus
Fish described in 1978